Jerzy Giedzieński  (died 1693) was a Roman Catholic prelate from Poland who served as Auxiliary Bishop of Lviv (1663–1693) and Titular Bishop of  Nicopolis in Epiro (1663–1693).

Biography
On 10 Dec 1663, Jerzy Giedzieński was appointed during the papacy of Pope Urban VIII as Auxiliary Bishop of Lviv and Titular Bishop of  Nicopolis in Epiro. He was consecrated bishop in 1664. He served as Auxiliary Bishop of Lviv until his death in 1693.

References

External links and additional sources
 (for Chronology of Bishops) 
 (for Chronology of Bishops)  
 (for Chronology of Bishops) 

1693 deaths
17th-century Roman Catholic bishops in the Polish–Lithuanian Commonwealth
Bishops appointed by Pope Urban VIII